Ab Bid-e Mazeh Koreh (also Romanized as Āb Bīd-e Māzeh Koreh) is a village in Sarfaryab Rural District, Sarfaryab District, Charam County, Kohgiluyeh and Boyer-Ahmad Province, Iran. At the 2006 census, its population was 29, in 5 families.

References 

Populated places in Charam County